Senate elections were held in Cambodia on 22 January 2006 to elect 57 of the 61 Senators of Cambodia. The result was a victory for the Cambodian People's Party which won 45 seats. The Funcinpec Party won 10 seats, and the Sam Rainsy Party won 2 seats. This is the first Senate election in Cambodia since previous Senators were appointed by Parliament and the King.

Results

References

Cambodia
Elections in Cambodia
Senate